Polovragi is a commune in Gorj County, Oltenia, Romania. It is composed of two villages, Polovragi and Racovița.

References

Communes in Gorj County
Localities in Oltenia